The whiskered pitta (Erythropitta kochi) is a rare species of bird in the family Pittidae. It is endemic to Luzon in the Philippines. This bird is the largest pitta in the country reaching 23 cm long and 116 g in mass. It has a brownish head, blue breast, and red belly. It has broad ash malar or "whiskers". Its natural habitat is tropical moist lowland forest and tropical moist montane forest. It is threatened by habitat loss and trapping. It is one of the most sought after birds by birdwatchers in the Philippines.

Description 

EBird describes the bird as "A medium-sized bird of lower-elevation montane forest floor and undergrowth on Luzon. Prefers thick undergrowth with moss, ferns, and a steep slope. Brown on the back and sides with a red belly, a blue chest, tail, and edge of the wing, rufous on the back of the head, a dark face with a pale moustache, and a pale line behind the eye. Very similar to Blue-breasted Pitta, but Whiskered usually occurs at higher elevations, has an obvious whisker on the face, and has a brown rather than green back. Song is a long, mournful downslurred note followed by several shorter ones, “doooo doo-doo-doo-doo!”."

Habitat and conservation status 
It chiefly inhabits montane forest, tolerating degraded and selectively logged areas. Records span a wide altitudinal range of 360 to 2,200 m. However, the highest densities found at 900-1,500 m where it typically breeds. It appears to prefer closed-canopy, primary montane, oak dominated forest, frequently on steep slopes. Its movements are poorly understood. Records from south Luzon (which may refer to wintering individuals) suggest that there is some intra-island migration..

IUCN has assessed this bird as near threatened with estimates being at 10,000 to 19,999 mature individuals. This species' main threat is habitat loss with wholesale clearance of forest habitats as a result of logging, agricultural conversion and mining activities occurring within the range. It is also threatened by hunting in snare traps. 

It occurs in a number of protected areas, including the Northern Sierra Madre Natural Park, Mount Pulag Natural Park, Mt. Isarog and the Maria Aurora National Park however enforcement against loggers and hunters is lax.  It is also listed as CITES Appendix I.

References

whiskered pitta
Endemic birds of the Philippines
Birds of Luzon
whiskered pitta
whiskered pitta
Taxonomy articles created by Polbot